Friedrich Jolly (24 November 1844 – 4 January 1904) was a German neurologist and psychiatrist who was a native of Heidelberg, and the son of physicist Philipp von Jolly (1809–1884).

He studied medicine at Göttingen under Georg Meissner (1829–1905), and in 1867 received his doctorate at Munich. In 1868 he became an assistant to Bernhard von Gudden (1824–1886) and Hubert von Grashey (1839–1914) at the mental institution in Werneck, and in 1870 was an assistant to Franz von Rinecker (1811–1883) at the Juliusspital in Würzburg.

In 1873 Jolly became director of the psychiatric clinic in Strassburg, where he was named as successor to Richard von Krafft-Ebing (1840–1902). In 1890 he succeeded Karl Friedrich Otto Westphal (1833–1890) as director of the neuropsychiatric clinic at the Berlin Charité.

Jolly is remembered for his pioneer research of myasthenia gravis, including the electrophysiological aspects involving abnormal fatigue associated with the disease which forms the basis of Jolly's test. He is credited with coining the term myasthenia gravis pseudoparalytica for the disorder. 

He was the author of an influential treatise on hypochondria that was published in Hugo Wilhelm von Ziemssen's "Handbuch der speciellen Pathologie und Therapie". His "Untersuchungen über den elektrischen Leitungswiderstand des menschlichen Körpers" (1884) was fundamental to the study of electrical diagnostics.

His grave is preserved in the Protestant Friedhof III der Jerusalems- und Neuen Kirchengemeinde (Cemetery No. III of the congregations of Jerusalem's Church and New Church) in Berlin-Kreuzberg, south of Hallesches Tor.

References
 Friedrich Jolly @ Who Named It

1844 births
1904 deaths
German psychiatrists
German neurologists
Physicians from Heidelberg
Academic staff of the Humboldt University of Berlin
Academic staff of the University of Strasbourg
Physicians of the Charité